Martins Dukurs (born 31 March 1984) is a Latvian skeleton racer who has competed since 1998. He is a six-time world champion in men's skeleton, a double Olympic silver winner (at Vancouver 2010 and Sochi 2014), and the athlete with the most World Cup titles with a total of 11, having won eight consecutive titles between 2010 and 2017, plus another three consecutive titles between 2020 and 2022.

Career

Dukurs finished seventh in the men's skeleton event at the 2006 Winter Olympics in Turin and sixth in the men's skeleton event at the 2007 FIBT World Championships in St. Moritz. He won the gold medal in the men's event at the 2011 FIBT World Championships, 2012 FIBT World Championships, 2015 FIBT World Championships, 2016 FIBT World Championships and 2017 FIBT World Championships.

Martins won the overall World Cup for the 2009–10, 2010–11, 2011–12, 2012–13, 2013–14, 2014–15, 2015–16 season, 2016–17 season and 2019–20 season.

At the end of the 2019–20 Skeleton World Cup season, he had 54 World Cup race victories.

His older brother Tomass is also a skeleton racer. Both he and his brother qualified for the 2010 Winter Olympics and the 2014 Winter Olympics.
In 2010 Martins Dukurs was decorated with the Order of the Three Stars.

In November 2017, Sochi gold medalist Alexander Tretiakov was disqualified by the IOC, and his medal stripped from him; however, a decision on whether Martins Dukurs would be granted a gold medal was not made by the IBSF. He would have been the first-ever Latvian athlete to win gold at the Winter Olympics. However, Tretiakov would appeal against his disqualification to the Court of Arbitration for Sport, who overturned his disqualification and reinstated his gold medal.

On 19 January 2018, Martins was retroactively disqualified from the 2018 St. Moritz World Cup for having a too-hard sled.

Martins and Tomass' father, Dainis Dukurs, is a former bobsleigh brakeman, former manager of the Sigulda sledding track, sled designer, and coach of the Latvian skeleton team.

In August 2022, Dukurs was appointed a performance coach for the British national team.

Career results

Skeleton World Cup

References

External links

1984 births
Living people
Sportspeople from Riga
People from Sigulda
Latvian male skeleton racers
Olympic skeleton racers of Latvia
Olympic silver medalists for Latvia
Skeleton racers at the 2006 Winter Olympics
Skeleton racers at the 2010 Winter Olympics
Skeleton racers at the 2014 Winter Olympics
Skeleton racers at the 2018 Winter Olympics
Skeleton racers at the 2022 Winter Olympics
University of Latvia alumni
Olympic medalists in skeleton
Medalists at the 2010 Winter Olympics
Medalists at the 2014 Winter Olympics
20th-century Latvian people
21st-century Latvian people